Süleymanuşağı is a village in the Pülümür District, Tunceli Province, Turkey. The village is populated by Kurds of the Rutan tribe and had a population of 47 in 2021.

The hamlets of Algılı, Çakırlı, Heybeli, Köse and Sızmalı are attached to the village.

References 

Kurdish settlements in Tunceli Province
Villages in Pülümür District